The British Virgin Islands has issued revenue stamps since 1988. The first issue consisted of two values of $25 and $100, which represented the fee for wedding licences. In 1996, a set of three values of $10, $40 and $50 was issued with a design showing a bird. The first issue had no imprint date, but the $40 is also known with imprint dates of 1997, 1999 and 2003. A $100 recently was added to the series, and a $500 in 2011.

The United States Virgin Islands also issue their own revenues.

References

Economy of the British Virgin Islands
Philately of the British Virgin Islands
British Virgin Islands